In sewing, cord is a trimming made by twisting or plying two or more strands of yarn together. Cord is used in a number of textile arts including dressmaking, upholstery, macramé, and couching. Soft cotton cord forms the filling for piping.

See also
 Passementerie
55

Notes

References

Gates, Dorothy, The Essential Guide to Upholstery, Toronto and Vancouver, Whitecap Books, 2000.
Kadolph, Sara J., ed.: Textiles, 10th edition, Pearson/Prentice-Hall, 2007, p. 63

Notions (sewing)
Yarn